The Mirror Crack'd from Side to Side, a novel by Agatha Christie, was published in the UK in 1962 and a year later in the US under the title The Mirror Crack'd. The story features amateur detective Miss Marple solving a mystery in St. Mary Mead.

Plot summary
Jane Marple falls while walking in St. Mary Mead. She is helped by Heather Badcock, who brings her into her own home to rest. Over a cup of tea, Heather tells Miss Marple how she met the American actress Marina Gregg, who recently moved into the area and bought Gossington Hall from Miss Marple's friend Dolly Bantry.

Marina and her latest husband, film producer Jason Rudd, host a fête in honour of St John Ambulance. Guests include Mrs Bantry, actress Lola Brewster, Marina's friend Ardwyck Fenn, and Heather with her husband Arthur. Heather corners Marina and launches into a long story about how they met years ago while Marina was visiting Bermuda, where Heather worked at the time. Heather had been ill, but was such a big fan of Marina that she left her sickbed to meet her favourite star and get her autograph. Mrs Bantry, standing nearby, notices a strange look cross Marina's face during Heather's monologue. A short while later, Heather collapses and dies.

When Mrs Bantry recounts the events to Miss Marple, she uses lines from the poem "The Lady of Shalott" (in which a curse falls upon the heroine of the poem) to describe the look she observed on Marina's face. Detective Inspector Frank Cornish of the local police begins to investigate the case, learning that the drug had been in a daiquiri given to her by Marina after she spilled her own drink. Cornish hands the case over to Chief Inspector Dermot Craddock, of Scotland Yard, when the latter is assigned to it in response to the county's request for assistance.

Craddock delves into the complicated past of the presumed target, Marina. Desperate to have a child, she had adopted three before giving birth to a mentally disabled son and suffering a nervous breakdown. One of the adopted children, Margot Bence, was at Gossington Hall on the day of the fête. Despite bad feeling towards her adoptive mother, she denies putting the drug into Marina's drink.

Two more people are killed while the investigation continues: Ella Zielinsky, Jason's social secretary, dies after the atomizer she uses for her hay fever is poisoned with cyanide; and Giuseppe, Marina's butler, is shot that night after spending the day in London and depositing £500 into his bank account. Ardwyck Fenn tells Craddock he received a phone call days before, accusing him of killing Heather, and that he recognized the anonymous caller as Zielinsky when she sneezed. Meanwhile, Marina and Jason both suspect that Marina is being targeted for death; she has been receiving a series of threatening notes, and a cup of coffee served to her proves to contain arsenic.

Miss Marple's cleaner, Cherry Baker, tells Miss Marple that her friend Gladys Dixon, who was a server at Gossington Hall on the day of the fête, believes Marina deliberately spilled Heather's drink and was going to meet Giuseppe before he died. After Gladys suddenly departs for a holiday in Bournemouth, Miss Marple travels to Gossington Hall to discover Marina has died in her sleep from an overdose.

Miss Marple talks to Jason and explains to him and DI Craddock how she has deduced that Marina must have been the murderer. Heather had been sick with German measles when she sought Marina's autograph in Bermuda. Marina, in the early stages of pregnancy at the time, had contracted the disease, which led to her baby being born disabled and her own subsequent nervous breakdown. The look on Marina's face, observed by Mrs Bantry at the fete, was triggered by Marina looking at a picture of a Madonna and Child on the wall behind Heather, and finally realising what had happened. Overcome with emotion, Marina put the Calmo in her own daiquiri, jolted Heather's arm to make her spill her drink, and then gave Heather the drugged cocktail as a replacement. To cover her crime, Marina tried to convince everyone she had been the target of a murder attempt, writing the threatening notes herself and putting the arsenic into her own coffee. She killed Ella and Giuseppe after they guessed her involvement and blackmailed her. Miss Marple had sent Gladys away to protect her from becoming Marina's next victim.

Miss Marple implies that she believes Jason administered Marina's overdose to prevent her from taking another life. He simply comments on his wife's beauty and the suffering she endured as the story ends.

The novel's title
The title comes from the poem The Lady of Shalott by Alfred, Lord Tennyson.                   
Out flew the web and floated wide-
The mirror crack'd from side to side;
"The curse is come upon me," cried 
The Lady of Shalott.

Characters
 Miss Marple: an old lady in St Mary Mead who is recovering from an illness.
 Mrs Cherry Baker: Miss Marple's house cleaner.
 Jim Baker: Cherry's husband, who does odd jobs for Miss Marple.
 Miss Knight: Miss Marple's carer, sent by Marple's nephew Raymond West, to help during her recuperation.
 Dolly Bantry: Miss Marple's friend, present at the fête at Gossington Hall. She first appeared in the novel The Body in the Library.
 Dr Haydock: Miss Marple's physician in St Mary Mead. He first appeared in Murder at the Vicarage.
 Marina Gregg: a middle-aged film star, who married many times and recently settled in England with her husband to make a film together. Her mood swings from happy to upset, which her husband thinks is tied to her acting.
 Jason Rudd: Gregg's husband, a film director.
 Giuseppe: a butler at Gossington Hall.
 Dr Gilchrist: Gregg's physician, who lives at the Hall.
 Ella Zielinsky: Rudd's secretary.
 Gladys Dixon: a seamstress who works at the film studio's canteen.
 Heather Badcock: a volunteer for the St John Ambulance corps.
 Arthur Badcock: Heather's husband, who works in real estate. He was married to Gregg before she became a film star and later changed his name.
 Margot Bence: a portrait photographer at the fête. She was adopted by Gregg before Gregg became pregnant.
 Lola Brewster: an American actress who arrives unexpectedly at the party. She was married to one of Gregg's ex-husbands.
 Ardwyck Fenn: an American man who was once wildly in love with Marina Gregg.
 Dermot Craddock: Chief Inspector at Scotland Yard, sent to St Mary Mead to solve Badcock's murder. He is a godson of Sir Henry Clithering, who is a close friend of Marple. Craddock often discusses the case with her. He was introduced in A Murder Is Announced.
 William Tiddler: a sergeant assisting Craddock, who calls him "Tom" because he likes the alliteration.
 Frank Cornish: a local police inspector.

Developing the character of Marina Gregg
Clinical and Experimental Ophthalmology emphasized that "Gregg" is the surname of the ophthalmologist who first described cataracts in congenital rubella syndrome, Norman Gregg, and described this as "one of [Christie's] most subtle clues to identify the murderer".

The official site of the Agatha Christie estate suggests that, in writing Gregg, Christie was "influenced" by the life of American actress Gene Tierney.

Tierney contracted German measles while pregnant with her first child, during her only appearance at the Hollywood Canteen in June 1943. The baby developed congenital rubella syndrome and was born prematurely, underweight and needing a total blood transfusion. Doctors told the parents on the day of the birth that the premature birth and the child's mental and physical disabilities were due to the mother contracting German measles in the first four months of the pregnancy; this was very hard news to absorb.

The deaf, partially blind and developmentally disabled child was later institutionalised in a psychiatric hospital. About two years after that birth a woman asked Tierney for an autograph at a garden party. The woman said she had, while ill with German measles, skipped quarantine in order to visit the Hollywood Canteen and meet Tierney.

Tierney's story was publicised before the novel was written. Tierney described the event in her autobiography 16 years after Christie wrote the novel.

Publication history
 1962, Collins Crime Club (London), 12 November 1962, hardback, 256 pp
 1963, Dodd Mead and Company (New York), September 1963, hardback, 246 pp
 1964, Pocket Books (New York), paperback
 1965, Fontana Books (imprint of HarperCollins), paperback, 192 pp
 1966, Ulverscroft large-print edition, hardcover, 255 pp
 1974, Penguin Books, paperback, 224 pp
 2006, Marple facsimile edition (facsimile of 1962 UK first edition), 6 March 2006, hardcover, 
 2011 William Morrow and Company, trade paperback, 288 pp, 

The Star Weekly Novel, a Toronto newspaper supplement, serialised the novel in two abridged instalments from 9 to 16 March 1963 under the title The Mirror Crack'd with each issue containing a cover illustration by Gerry Sevier.

Adaptations to other media

English-language movie
The novel was adapted for a 1980 feature film with Angela Lansbury in the role of Miss Marple. The film's co-stars were Elizabeth Taylor as Marina and Kim Novak as Lola Brewster, and the cast also included Rock Hudson and Tony Curtis. The film was released as The Mirror Crack'd, the shortened US book title. The film changed a number of elements in the novel, including Marina's surname (she uses Rudd, not Gregg), her associates, removing the character of Giuseppe, adding death threats, amongst other modifications—which include shifting the setting to 1953, nine years before the book's publication.

BBC TV adaptation
A second adaptation of the novel was made by BBC television in 1992 as part of its series Miss Marple with the title role played by Joan Hickson (in her final performance as Jane Marple), and starring Claire Bloom as Marina Gregg and Glynis Barber as Lola Brewster. The only major changes are that Giuseppe is not killed, Arthur Badcock is not a former husband of Marina Gregg, Superintendent Slack and Sergeant Lake are written in, and the character of Hailey Preston is removed. The novel was the final adaptation for the BBC series Miss Marple. Margaret Courtenay appears in this adaptation as Miss Knight, having previously portrayed Dolly Bantry in the 1980 feature film version.

BBC radio adaptation
A radio adaptation was made by the BBC in 1998. June Whitfield played Miss Marple, and Gayle Hunnicutt Marina Gregg, in a 90-minute version by Michael Bakewell.

ITV adaptation
ITV Studios and WGBH Boston produced another adaptation in 2010 for the Marple television series, starring Julia McKenzie as Miss Marple, with Joanna Lumley reprising her role as Dolly Bantry, Lindsay Duncan as Marina Gregg and Hannah Waddingham as Lola Brewster. Investigating the murder along with Miss Marple is Inspector Hewitt, played by Hugh Bonneville. This version, while ultimately faithful to Christie's original text, included a number of notable changes. Some of these changes were influenced by the changes that were made in the 1980 film adaptation:
 Ella's surname is changed from Zielinsky to Blunt. The reason for her murder is changed, mixing in elements from the 1980 film and the motive for Giuseppe's murder – Ella was attempting to blackmail the killer, but kept ringing the wrong people because she knew someone at the reception had done it, until she learned something that led her to phoning Marina and pointing out what she had done. Her love of Jason remains, but there is no affair.
 Giuseppe is omitted from the adaptation, and there is no reference to car-man Inch selling his business within it.
 Unlike the 1980 film adaptation, only one film is being shot in England, and that focuses on Nefertiti.
 Lola Brewster is married to one of Marina's old husbands, Vincent Hogg (added in the adaptation). He is a journalist, who writes a couple of pieces regarding the murders and who does not have much love of Marina; she is an actress and had competed with Marina for the love of Jason, who married the latter, leaving Lola bitter about it. Both she and Vincent attend the reception and the filming of one of Marina's scenes.

Bengali language film
Film director and screenwriter Rituparno Ghosh created a Bengali language version of Christie's story as Shubho Mahurat, which reset the story in the film industry of Kolkata. In this version, Sharmila Tagore plays the ageing star Padmini, the counterpart to Christie's Marina Gregg. The 2003 movie features Rakhi Gulzar in the role of the equivalent of Miss Marple.

French television adaptation
The novel was adapted as a 2017 episode of the French television series Les Petits Meurtres d'Agatha Christie.

Japanese television adaptation
TV Asahi adapted the novel in 2018 starring Ikki Sawamura and Hitomi Kuroki, with the title Two Nights Drama Special: Murder of the Great Actress – The Mirror Crack'd From Side to Side as the second night, and the first night was 4.50 from Paddington. This drama changed the main role to a chief inspector from the Tokyo Metropolitan Police Department.
 Cast:
 Ikki Sawamura – Chief Inspector Ryuya Shokokuji, based on Jane Marple and Dermot Craddock
 Yoshiyoshi Arakawa – Inspector Banpei Tatara
 Erena Mizusawa – Inspector Fueko Misaki
 Hitomi Kuroki – Madoka Irodori, based on Marina Gregg
 Ikko Furuya – Akira Kaido, based on Jason Rudd
 Naomi Zaizen – Sagiri Asakaze, based on Lola Brewster
 Masahiko Tsugawa – Hiraomi Danbara, based on Ardwyck Fenn
 Mari Nishio – Shimeko Akada, based on Ella Zielinsky
 Tomoharu Hasegawa – Toshiro Inden, based on Giuseppe
 Ryuji Katagiri – Kansuke Aramaki, based on Dr Gilchrist
 Kami Hiraiwa – Rin Kannokoji, based on Heather Badcock
 Takeo Nakahara – Koki Kannokoji, based on Arthur Badcock
 Haruna Kawaguchi – Kosame Taniguchi, based on Margot Bence
 Hayato Isomura – Matsubushi Matsuda, based on Margot Bence and Gladys Dixon
 Narumi Fukuda – Hinata Hanakage, also based on Margot Bence
 Zuimaru Awashima – Sosuke Aiba, based on Donald McNeil

Korean television adaptation
The novel was also adapted as part of the Korean television series Ms. Ma, Nemesis.

References

External links
 The Mirror Crack'd from Side to Side at the official Agatha Christie website
 The Mirror Crack'd from Side to Side at the new Home of Agatha Christie website
 
 
 

Miss Marple novels
1962 British novels
Novels about actors
Collins Crime Club books
Rubella
British novels adapted into films
British novels adapted into television shows
Cultural depictions of Empress Elisabeth of Austria